BlitWorks is a Spanish video game developer based in Barcelona, Spain. Founded in 2012, the company is best known for porting several games such as Fez, Sonic CD, Jet Set Radio, Super Meat Boy, Bastion, Spelunky and Don't Starve to a wide range of platforms such as PlayStation 5, PS4, PS3, PS Vita, Xbox Series X|S, Xbox One, Xbox 360, Steam, Stadia, Nintendo Switch, Wii U, iOS and Android.

History 
The founders started working together in 2011, porting the 2011 remake of Sonic CD for Sega. At that time, they developed it under a software company already owned by two of them, Blit Software, as a temporary measure. After Sonic CD, they ported Jet Set Radio and then started to receive more porting inquiries so the founders decided it was worth focusing on game porting. Therefore, in 2012, they founded BlitWorks S.L. as a completely independent company.

BlitWorks developed a proprietary tool called "Unsharper", which translates C# into C++ code, that has been used on some of their ports. BlitWorks has partnered with the QA company Lollipop Robot in 2013. In 2020, it co-developed Spelunky 2 with Mossmouth.

Games 
The company worked on ports of the following games:

References

External links 
 

Companies based in Barcelona
Video game companies of Spain
Video game development companies
Video game companies established in 2012
Spanish companies established in 2012